The following is a list of notable botanical scientific journals.

General botany 

The following table is a list of scientific journals publishing articles on many areas of botany.

Agronomy and horticulture 

The following table is a list of botany journals specialising in agronomy, including crop science and horticulture.

Dendrology 

the following table is a list of journals that specialize in publishing articles on dendrology.

Plant pathology 

The following table is a list of botany journals specializing in plant pathology.

Review journals 

The following table is a list of botany journals that contain collections of review papers about general plant science.

 
Botany
Botany journals